The Sailor's Creed is a code of ethics of the United States Navy, originally developed for the promotion of personal excellence.

While other regulations, codes, and standards may apply to the United States Armed Forces writ large, the Sailor's Creed is specific to the Navy. It focuses on self-respect, respect for others, and the Navy's core values of honor, courage, and commitment. Recited by units almost daily, the Sailor's Creed reinforces the notion that personnel are sailors first (i.e., before their rating) and seeks to build esprit de corps throughout the Navy as a whole.

History

Original version
The first version of the Sailor's Creed came from an idea in 1986 by Admiral James D. Watkins, Chief of Naval Operations, to form a group that would create a Code of Ethics for the Navy. The result of this meeting at the Naval War College was the eight-point The Navy Uniform, and was later scaled down to a shorter version called the Sailor's Creed. The original text was as follows:

Current version
The current version of the Sailor's Creed was a product of many Blue Ribbon Recruit Training Panels in 1993 at the direction of Admiral Frank B. Kelso II, Chief of Naval Operations. It has been revised twice, once in 1994 under the direction of Chief of Naval Operations Admiral Jeremy Boorda and again in 1997.  These changes were made to make the creed inclusively descriptive of all hands. The creed is taught and recited in boot camp and at some officer accession programs.

See also
Hospital corpsman's pledge
Rifleman's Creed (USMC)
Airman's Creed
Soldier's Creed
Quartermaster Creed
Ranger Creed
Creed of the United States Coast Guardsman
Noncommissioned officer's creed

References

United States Navy
Warrior code